No. 661 Squadron was a Royal Air Force Air Observation Post squadron associated with the Canadian 1st Army and later part of the Royal Auxiliary Air Force. Numbers 651 to 663 Squadrons of the RAF were Air Observation Post units working closely with Army units in artillery spotting and liaison. A further three of these squadrons, 664–666, were manned with Canadian personnel. Their duties and squadron numbers were transferred to the Army with the formation of the Army Air Corps on 1 September 1957.

History

Formation and World War II
No. 661 Squadron was formed at RAF Old Sarum on 31 August 1943 with the Auster III and in March 1944 the Auster IV. The squadron role was to support the Canadian 1st Army and in July 1944 it moved to France. Fighting in the break-out from Normandy it followed the Canadians across the low countries and into Germany. The squadron disbanded at Ghent, Belgium on 31 October 1945.

Post-war
After the war the Air Observation Squadrons were reformed and No. 661 Squadron Royal Auxiliary Air Force was as such formed at RAF Kenley on 1 May 1949, consisting of five flights -nos. 1957, 1958, 1959, 1960 and 1961 (Reserve) AOP Flights-, to provide support to the Army in the south London and Surrey area until it was disbanded on 10 March 1957 at RAF Henlow.

No. 1957 Air Observation Post Flight was formed within 662 Squadron along with No. 1958 Air Observation Post Flight, No. 1959 Air Observation Post Flight, No. 1960 Air Observation Post Flight & No. 1961 Air Observation Post Flight.

Aircraft operated

Surviving aircraft
One known 661 Squadron aircraft survives in airworthy condition.

See also
List of Royal Air Force aircraft squadrons

References

Notes

Bibliography

External links
 Squadron history for nos. 651–670 sqn. at RAF Web
 661 sqn. page of RAF website

Military units and formations established in 1943
661 Squadron